Artoriopsis is a genus of wolf spiders first described by Volker W. Framenau in 2007. It is endemic to Australia and is most diverse in the southern half of the continent, though A. anacardium is found in the tropical north of Australia. It appears to prefer open, vegetated or sandy areas of moderate humidity.

Species
 it contains twelve species:
 Artoriopsis anacardium Framenau, 2007 — Northern Territory, Queensland
 Artoriopsis bogabilla Framenau & Douglas, 2021 — New South Wales
 Artoriopsis eccentrica Framenau, 2007 — Western Australia, South Australia, Victoria
 Artoriopsis expolita (L. Koch, 1877) — Australia (incl. Tasmania), New Zealand
 Artoriopsis joergi Framenau, 2007 — Western Australia, South Australia
 Artoriopsis klausi Framenau, 2007 — South Australia, New South Wales, Victoria
 Artoriopsis lacustris Framenau & Douglas, 2021 — New South Wales
 Artoriopsis melissae Framenau, 2007 — Queensland to Tasmania
 Artoriopsis mulier Framenau & Douglas, 2021 — Capital Territory
 Artoriopsis murphyi Framenau & Douglas, 2021 — Tasmania
 Artoriopsis orientalis Framenau & Douglas, 2021 — New South Wales
 Artoriopsis whitehouseae Framenau, 2007 — Queensland, New South Wales

References

Lycosidae
Spiders of Australia
Araneomorphae genera